"Siente El Boom" (English: "Feel the Boom") is a single by Tito El Bambino featuring Randy from the album Chosen Few II: El Documental. The remix features De La Ghetto, Jowell & Randy which is in the album Top of the Line: El Internacional as well as in the video game Grand Theft Auto IV. Another remix, with rapper Joell Ortiz was included in the album Chosen Few: Remix Classicos. It was released digitally on July 12, 2006.

Music video
 "Siente El Boom (remix)" official music video

Charts

Siente El Boom 2

Guelo Star released a sequel version of "Siente El Boom" as the second single from the debut studio album, The Movie Man.

References 

2007 singles
Tito El Bambino songs
Record Report Top Latino number-one singles
Jowell & Randy songs
2006 songs